John Milton Goodenow (1782July 20, 1838) was a U.S. Representative from Ohio.

Born in Westmoreland, New Hampshire, Goodenow attended the public schools.
He engaged in mercantile pursuits.
He studied law.
He was admitted to the bar and commenced practice in Steubenville, Ohio, in 1813.
He was appointed collector of direct taxes and internal duties for the sixth collection district of Ohio in 1817.
He served as member of the State house of representatives in 1823.

He served the Freemasons as Grand Master of the Grand Lodge of Ohio in 1827.

Goodenow was elected as a Jacksonian to the Twenty-first Congress and served from March 4, 1829, until April 9, 1830, when he resigned, having been chosen a judge of the Supreme Court of Ohio. He resigned in the summer of 1830 on account of ill health. He moved to Cincinnati in 1832.

An Ohio Presidential elector in 1832 for Andrew Jackson, he was appointed presiding judge of the court of common pleas in 1833.
He died in Cincinnati, July 20, 1838.
He was interred in Spring Grove Cemetery, Cincinnati.

Publications
 - "was the first important commentary on the status of the English common law in America", and "is an important resource for legal historians studying the development of American jurisprudence.", though only 100 copies were printed.

Notes

References

Attribution

1782 births
1838 deaths
Masonic Grand Masters
People from Westmoreland, New Hampshire
Politicians from Steubenville, Ohio
Ohio lawyers
Burials at Spring Grove Cemetery
Members of the Ohio House of Representatives
Justices of the Ohio Supreme Court
1832 United States presidential electors
Jacksonian members of the United States House of Representatives from Ohio
19th-century American politicians